Events from the year 1843 in Russia

Incumbents
 Monarch – Nicholas I

Events

 
 
  
  
 
 
  

 St. Nicholas Cossack Cathedral
 St. Seraphim Chapel
 Stāmeriena Palace
 Kovno Governorate

Births

Deaths

References

1843 in Russia
Years of the 19th century in the Russian Empire